Bartodzieje  is a village in the administrative district of Gmina Niechlów, within Góra County, Lower Silesian Voivodeship, in south-western Poland.

It lies approximately 16 km west of Góra, and 79 km north-west of the regional capital Wrocław.

References

Bartodzieje